Limatula subauriculata, the small-eared file shell, is a species of bivalve mollusc in the family Limidae. It can be found along the Atlantic coast of North America, ranging from Greenland to the West Indies.

References

Limidae
Bivalves described in 1808